Jamie Olejnik (born 8 March 1973) is a former professional rugby league footballer who played in the 1990s.

References

1973 births
Australian people of Serbian descent
Australian rugby league players
Penrith Panthers players
Manly Warringah Sea Eagles players
Paris Saint-Germain Rugby League players
Western Reds players
Rugby league centres
Living people